HC Achilles Bocholt is a Belgian handball team.

Crest, colours, supporters

Kits

Accomplishments

Belgian Championship: 
Winners (5) : 2004, 2016, 2017, 2018, 2019
Runner-Up (3) : 2010, 2013, 2014
BENE-League: 
Winners (5) : 2013, 2017, 2018, 2019, 2020
Runner-Up (2) : 2010, 2022
Belgian Handball Cup: 
Winners (3) : 2013, 2015, 2017

European record

External links
Official website

Belgian handball clubs